McEwens Beach is a coastal town and rural locality in the Mackay Region, Queensland, Australia.

Geography 
The locality is bounded to the east by the Coral Sea with a long sandy beach along the length of the coast, also known as McEwens Beach. The town of McEwens Beach is on the south-eastern coast facing Sandringham Bay.

The north-east of the locality is Bakers Creek Conservation Park. The aim of the park is to protect the shore birds. This includes both the Australian beach stone-curlew which is deemed as vulnerable as well as migratory shore birds.

The town is a small residential area along the south-east coast, accessible via McEwens Beach Road. The area surrounding the town is undeveloped, being mostly marshland. The west of the locality is used to grow sugarcane while the middle of the locality is used for grazing on native vegetation.

There is a cane tramway in the west of the locality to transport the harvested sugarcane to the local sugar mill for processing.

History 
The area was named as a township by the Queensland Place Names Board on 11 December 1980.

Amenities 
The Mackay Regional Council operates a mobile library service on a fortnightly schedule at Aura Street.

McEwens Beach Reserve is a foreshore park to the south of the town. There is an foreshore esplanade at the north of the town.

Education 
There are no schools in McEwens Beach. The nearest primary school is Chelona State School in neighbouring Chelona to the south-west. The nearest secondary school is Mackay State High School in Mackay to the north.

References

Towns in Queensland
Mackay Region
Coastline of Queensland
Localities in Queensland